Rebekka Bakken (born April 4, 1970 in Lier, near Oslo) is a Norwegian singer, songwriter and music producer who is often associated with jazz, although she refuses to characterise herself as a jazz musician. Her voice reaches over three octaves.

Career 
Bakken began singing in various school bands, before beginning to sing with professional soul, funk and rock bands in 1988. She is known for her particularly expressive and varied voice, performing music that is a combination of folk, jazz and pop.

Honors 
2007: Recipient of the Amadeus Austrian Music Award in the category jazz/blues/folk for her album I Keep My Cool

Discography

Solo 
 2003: The Art of How to Fall (EmArcy/Universal)
 2005: Is That You? (Boutique/Universal)
 2006: I Keep My Cool (EmArcy/Universal)
 2007: Building Visions (Universal)
 2009: Morning Hours (EmArcy/Universal)
 2011: September (EmArcy/Universal)
 2014: Little Drop of Poison (EmArcy/Universal)
 2016: Most Personal (EmArcy/Universal)
 2018: Things You Leave Behind (Okeh/Sony)
 2020: Winter Nights (Okeh/Sony)

Duo 
with Wolfgang Muthspiel
 2000: Daily Mirror (Material)
 2001: Daily Mirror Reflected (Material)
 2002: Beloved with Wolfgang Muthspiel (Material)

Collaborations 
 2003: Scattering Poems (ACT), with Julia Hülsmann Trio
 2003: Heaven (ACT), with Christof Lauer & Norwegian Brass with Sondre Bratland, Geir Lysne

References

External links 
 
 Site at Universal
 Rebekka Bakken – Same Kind (official Video) HD at YouTube

1970 births
Living people
Norwegian women jazz singers
Norwegian jazz singers
English-language singers from Norway
Musicians from Oslo
21st-century Norwegian singers
21st-century Norwegian women singers
Okeh Records artists
EmArcy Records artists